Andy Enz (born August 15, 1991) is an American mixed martial artist who most recently competed in the Middleweight division of the Ultimate Fighting Championship.

Background
Born and raised in Anchorage, Alaska, Enz began wrestling at the age of four and began boxing from a young age, under the tutelage of his father. At the age of 14, he began training in Brazilian jiu-jitsu. A graduate of Service High School, he had a fourth-place finish during his senior season competing at 215 lbs.

Mixed martial arts career

Early career
Enz began his professional career in 2010, as a 17-year-old high school senior. After compiling a record of 6-1, he was invited to compete on The Ultimate Fighter: Team Jones vs. Team Sonnen.

The Ultimate Fighter
After making it through the tryouts, Enz faced Uriah Hall in the preliminary bout to get into the house and make it to the final cast. Enz lost a unanimous decision, breaking his arm in the process but still managing to make it to a decision.

Ultimate Fighting Championship
After earning three consecutive first-round submission wins on the regional scene in Alaska, Enz was signed by the UFC.

Enz made his promotional debut against Clint Hester at UFC 169 on February 2, 2015. He lost via unanimous decision.

Enz returned to face Marcelo Guimaraes at UFC Fight Night: Swanson vs. Stephens. He lost again via split decision.

Enz then faced Thiago Santos at UFC 183. He was defeated via TKO from a body kick and follow up punches in the first round and subsequently released from the promotion.

Mixed martial arts record

|-
| Loss
| align=center| 10-4
| Thiago Santos
| TKO (body kick and punches)
| UFC 183: Silva vs. Diaz
| 
| align=center| 1
| align=center| 1:56
| Las Vegas, Nevada, United States
| 
|-
| Loss
| align=center| 10-3
| Marcelo Guimarães
| Decision (split)
| UFC Fight Night: Swanson vs. Stephens
| 
| align=center| 3
| align=center| 5:00
| San Antonio, Texas, United States
| 
|-
| Loss
| align=center| 10-2
| Clint Hester
| Decision (unanimous)
| UFC 169: Barao vs. Faber II
| 
| align=center| 3
| align=center| 5:00
| Newark, New Jersey, United States
| 
|-
| Win
| align=center| 10-1
| Mike Fannon
| Submission (north-south choke)
| Alaska FC 101: Tank Mode vs. Cannon
| 
| align=center| 1
| align=center| 0:58
| Anchorage, Alaska, United States
| 
|-
| Win
| align=center| 9-1
| Chris Cuff
| Submission (D'Arce choke)
| Alaska FC 99: Spring Beatings
| 
| align=center| 1
| align=center| 1:13
| Anchorage, Alaska, United States
| 
|-
| Win
| align=center| 8-1
| Thomas Ide
| TKO (submission to punches)
| Alaska FC 98: Heavyweights Collide
| 
| align=center| 1
| align=center| 0:40
| Anchorage, Alaska, United States
| 
|-
| Loss
| align=center| 7-1
| Julio Paulino
| Decision (unanimous)
| Alaska FC 91: Great North Grand Prix 2
| 
| align=center| 3
| align=center| 5:00
| Anchorage, Alaska, United States
| Alaska FC 91 Grand Prix Final.
|-
| Win
| align=center| 7-0
| Stephen Waalkes
| Submission (armbar)
| Alaska FC 91: Great North Grand Prix 2
| 
| align=center| 1
| align=center| N/A
| Anchorage, Alaska, United States
| Alaska FC 91 Grand Prix Semifinal.
|-
| Win
| align=center| 6-0
| Tommie Matthews
| KO (head kick)
| Alaska FC 91: Great North Grand Prix 2
| 
| align=center| 1
| align=center| N/A
| Anchorage, Alaska, United States
| Alaska FC 91 Grand Prix Quarterfinal.
|-
| Win
| align=center| 5-0
| Nic Herron-Webb
| Decision (split)
| Alaska FC 86
| 
| align=center| 5
| align=center| 5:00
| Anchorage, Alaska, United States
| Defended the Alaska FC Middleweight Championship.
|-
| Win
| align=center| 4-0
| Tyler Milner
| Decision (split)
| Alaska FC 77: Hardcore Harvest
| 
| align=center| 5
| align=center| 5:00
| Anchorage, Alaska, United States
| Won the Alaska FC Middleweight Championship.
|-
| Win
| align=center| 3-0
| Chase Jensen
| Submission (choke) 
| Alaska FC: Fight for Freedom 1
| 
| align=center| 2
| align=center| N/A
| Anchorage, Alaska, United States
| 
|-
| Win
| align=center| 2-0
| Rod Pucak
| Submission (rear-naked choke)
| Alaska FC 69: Proving Ground
| 
| align=center| 1
| align=center| 2:27
| Anchorage, Alaska, United States
| 
|-
| Win
| align=center| 1-0
| Tommie Matthews
| Submission (americana)
| Alaska FC 68
| 
| align=center| 1
| align=center| 1:26
| Anchorage, Alaska, United States
|

See also
List of male mixed martial artists

References

External links 

 
 Andy Enz's Big Break at fightland (Vice magazine)
 UFC 183 results, photos: Thiago 'Marreta' Santos tears through Andy Enz in first at MMAjunkie.com
 Andy Enz at MMAjunkie.com
 
 
 
 

1991 births
American male mixed martial artists
Middleweight mixed martial artists
Light heavyweight mixed martial artists
Mixed martial artists utilizing boxing
Mixed martial artists utilizing wrestling
Mixed martial artists utilizing Brazilian jiu-jitsu
Living people
Mixed martial artists from Alaska
Ultimate Fighting Championship male fighters
American practitioners of Brazilian jiu-jitsu